Warming may  refer to:

People
Eugenius Warming, (1841–1924), Danish botanist 
Thomas Warming, (b. 1969), Danish illustrator, painter and author

See also
Global warming
Warming up
Warming Land
Warming stripes, a data visualization technique for global warming